Vishwatma is a 1992 Indian Hindi-language thriller film directed by Rajiv Rai and produced by Gulshan Rai. It stars an ensemble cast of Sunny Deol, Naseeruddin Shah, Chunky Pandey, Divya Bharti (in her major Hindi debut), Sonam, Jyostna Singh. The film follows Prabhat, an honest police officer, being sent to Kenya on behalf of the Indian Government to capture the dreaded crime lord Ajgar Jurrat and bring an end to his illegal businesses. Viju Shah composed the music. The Song "Saat Samundar" became a huge chartbuster of that year. 

Vishwatma marked Rai's third directorial venture after the blockbuster Tridev (1989) and was initially planned to be a sequel to the same. It was the most-expensive Indian film at the time of its production; being extensively shot in Kenya and, it was the first Indian film to be shot there. The chartbuster song 'Saat Samundar' was shot at Bubbles Discothèque, a popular nightclub at Nairobi in those days. The modern-sounding song struck a chord and till now, enjoys a massive cult status among Indian audience.

The film received critical acclaim upon release from contemporary as well as modern critics, with praise drawn towards its screenplay and action sequences. The soundtrack created a rage and was very much successful. It proved to be a major launchpad for Chunky Pandey as well as for debutanté Divya Bharti, who went on to achieve the limelight in Bollywood.

Plot
Prabhat Singh is an honest and dedicated police officer, but he usually has no time for his family and due to this, his father is constantly at loggerheads with him. Prabhat's father believes in peace and opposes bloodshed /disturbance in his country. Prabhat is now placed on a mission to apprehend the most dreaded crime Lord "Ajgar Jurrat", who currently lives in Kenya but operates in India. Things take a turn for the worse when Prabhat kills Ajgar's brother in an encounter. An angered Ajgar abducts and kills Prabhat's young school-going brother. Prabhat's family is devastated and his father blames him for his brother's death and disowns him from the family. Prabhat moves to a remote corner of a distant village in India, where he takes in an orphan named Babu, who is his lone friend.

Meanwhile, one of Ajgar's men - Madan Bhardwaj - turns against him and threatens to turn him into the police as soon as possible. Fearing an arrest warrant, Ajgar has Madan killed on the night of his wedding. After that, Ajgar's son rapes Madan's wife, leaving her traumatised. Thus, Madan's brother Akash Bhardwaj swears revenge on Ajgar.

Later on, Ajgar flees to Kenya and the police commissioner decides to approach Prabhat as he is the only one who can capture Ajgar and take him back to India. After seeing the necessity of the situation (Madan's murder etc.), Prabhat's dad also changes his mind and decides to apologize for disowning Prabhat. To make amends, he tries to persuade Prabhat to take on the mission to capture Ajgar and bring some justice.
Prabhat agrees to take on the mission but insists that Akash also join him, to which Akash agrees. These two join hands and take the next flight all the way to Kenya. Meanwhile Babu goes to live with Prabhat's family as a servant.

In Kenya, they are met by their host, a honest inspector and widower with a young daughter, Surya Pratap. Ajgar is already aware that Prabhat and Akash are there to capture him, so he gets the corrupt Commissioner who is under his payroll to assign Surya to be their guide, knowing fully well that the law-abiding Surya will make sure Kenyan citizens like Ajgar will not be harmed by foreigners. During their journey to Surya's place, he mentions he has his eye on them and will not hesitate to apprehend them if they do any mischief during their stay. 

Prabhat and Akash find and meet Madan's sister-in-law Renuka, who's also on the same secret mission, so she helps them get nearer to Ajgar and offers them some more details on his whereabouts. She informs them that here Ajgar is a respected citizen in Kenya, so it is much harder to apprehend him. They try many tricks to capture Ajgar and his henchmen, but Surya foils them each time. Prabhat and Akash then try to persuade Surya to arrest Ajgar, but Surya is reluctant to put Ajgar behind bars. As a result, Surya gets very frustrated with the duo, because he thinks they are causing trouble in Kenya. Yet, he is unaware about their true mission. 

After a few days with the help of Renuka, Prabhat and Akash have made a breakthrough to apprehend Ajgar without Surya's knowledge and decide to make their move right away. Upon hearing this, a furious and betrayed Surya captures them and has them deported back to India. It is then that Renuka informs Surya about the truth behind his wife's mysterious death: his wife had committed suicide due to none other than Ajgar's foolish and vile son who had tried to molest her. After learning the truth and realizing that Prabhat and Akash were right after all, an enraged Surya confronts Ajgar, but is captured along with his daughter. Prabhat and Akash, who have escaped their flight to India, rescue Surya and the three join hands in the mission to catch Ajgar and his henchmen once and for all.

In the end, the mission is successful and romance begins: Akash falls in love with Ajgar's daughter Sonia; Surya begins to love Renuka and becomes thankful for her timely information and astute help and the lonesome Prabhat finally falls for the Indian girl whom he had met at his hometown in India who had followed him all the way to Kenya - Kusum. Prabhat finally returns to India along with his friends Surya and Akash and the captured criminal Ajgar. The couples Prabhat-Kusum, Surya-Renuka, and Akash-Sonia finally unite and rejoice.

Cast
 Sunny Deol as Prabhat Singh: Anurag's son; Kusum's love-interest and fiancé
 Naseeruddin Shah as Surya Pratap: Sunaina's father; Renuka's love-interest and fiancé
 Chunky Pandey as Akash Bharadwaj: Sonia's love-interest and fiancé 
 Divya Bharti as Kusum Verma: Prabhat's Love interest and fiancée 
  Sonam as Renuka: Surya's love-interest and fiancée; Madan's sister-in-law 
 Jyotsna Singh as Sonia Jurrat: Ajgar' daughter; Rajnagh's sister; Akash's love-interest; Tapasvi's former fiancée 
 Amrish Puri as Ajgar Jurrat: Rajnagh and Sonia's father
 Mahesh Anand as Rajnagh Jurrat: Ajgar's son; Sonia's brother 
 Kiran Kumar as Nagdansh Jurrat: Ajgar's brother
 Tej Sapru as Bada Nilu
 Dan Dhanoa as Majhla Nilu
 Anand Balraj as Chhota Nilu
 Gulshan Grover as Tapasvi Gunjal: Sonia's former fiancé 
 Rajesh Vivek as Dacoit Manohar Dev
 Master Manjunath as Babu: Prabhat's adoptive brother
 Dalip Tahil as ACP Gupta
 Sharat Saxena as Commissioner B.L. Roy
 Raza Murad as Commissioner Pandey
 Alok Nath as Anurag Singh: Prabhat's father
 Aparajita as Prabhat's mother; Anurag's wife
 Yunus Parvez as Mr. Verma (Verma ji): Kusum's father 
 Dinesh Hingoo as Mr. Sharma (Sharma ji): Kusum's maternal uncle
 Sanjay Kohli as Inspector Balbir Govot
 Vijay Arora as Central Jail Jailor
 Mangal Dhillon as Madan Bharadwaj: Akash's brother; Renuka's brother-in-law 
 Vishwajeet Pradhan as Madan and Akash's brother
 Samar Jai Singh as Madan and Akash's brither

Production
After the mega-success of his 1989 film Tridev, Rajiv Rai decided to embark on another action-thriller with three main male leads, and thus Vishwatma was conceived. Rai decided to go for a change of venue and planned to set much of the movie in Kenya. He wanted to cast the same three male leads as Tridev (Sunny Deol, Naseeruddin Shah, and Jackie Shroff). However, Jackie's son Tiger Shroff had just been born and his astrologer had advised him to not travel abroad for a year. Thus Rai, after considering to launch Suniel Shetty, a personal friend, opted to cast Chunky Pandey instead of Shroff as one of the leads.

Rai also reused many of the cast members from Tridev, including Amrish Puri as the main villain, and Raza Murad, Dalip Tahil, Tej Sapru, and Dan Dhanoa as the secondary villains. One main difference being that while Sharat Saxena played a negative role in Tridev, in this movie he had a positive role as the strict but comedic commissioner of the Kenya police. Rai also included a short narration about the meaning of "Vishwatma" by Naseeruddin Shah in the movie, something that he had done with "Tridev" as well.

Much of the shooting of the film was done in Kenya's main cities of Mombasa and Nairobi. The song "Saat Samundar" was shot at the "Bubbles Discotheque", a very popular club in Nairobi in those days. The climactic car chase was shot on the open plains of the Masai Mara National Wildlife Reserve. Many of the beach scenes were shot in Mombasa's various beaches and beach hotels.

The film also employs many Swahili phrases and words in its dialogue such as "Jambo" (Hello), "Mzuri sana" (Very nice), and "Mimi ni kubwa sana" (I am very big/great).

Soundtrack 

After the success of the music of Tridev, everyone expected Viju Shah to conjure magic with this film. The soundtrack was well received, selling 2million units and becoming the year's seventh best-selling Bollywood soundtrack album. Its most popular song was "Saat Samundar Paar", written by Anand Bakshi and rendered by Sadhna Sargam. The song uses a sample from the Pet Shop Boys song "Heart" (1988). "Saat Samundar Paar" continues to play on radio stations and at discothèques (remixed) 30 years later. The Vishwatma theme is copied from Enigma's Hallelujah with only the female humming as Viju Shah's input. It features playback singers Amit Kumar and Kumar Sanu (for Naseeruddin Shah), Alka Yagnik (for Jyostna Singh), Sadhana Sargam (for Divya Bharti), Udit Narayan (for Chunkey Pandey), Sapna Mukherjee (for Sonam) and Mohammad Aziz (For Sunny Deol).

For the 2014 movie Kick, the producer Sajid Nadiadwala bought the rights to the song "Saat Samundar" for Rs 1.5 crore. He did this to pay tribute to his late first wife Divya Bharti, on whom the song was picturized in Vishwatma. In Kick, the song plays in the background when Salman Khan is dancing in a disco.

The other songs that got noticed when the film was released were "Aankhon Mein Hain Kya", "Dil Le Gayi Teri Bindiya" and the title track. Sapna Mukherjee (who won her first Filmfare award with "Oye Oye — Tirchi Topi Wale" in Tridev) sang two tracks in this film, but could not re-create the Tridev magic. 

Toofan was a very unique track which sampled African beats and like Dil Le Gayi Teri Bindiya did earlier in the film, sampled the New kids on the block debut hit single Hangin' Tough (song). Ironically it was so well utilized that many didn't recognize the sample. This track too gained a cult following and was a favorite for djs as well.

All the songs were penned by Anand Bakshi.
Track list

References

External links
 

Trimurti Films
1992 films
1990s Hindi-language films
Films scored by Viju Shah
Films set in Kenya
Indian action thriller films
Films directed by Rajiv Rai
1992 action thriller films